Shane Steven Filan (born 5 July 1979) is an Irish pop singer. He is one of the two lead singers of pop vocal group Westlife, which was formed in 1998, disbanded in 2012, and regrouped in 2018. Westlife have released thirteen albums, embarked on twelve world tours, and won several awards, becoming one of the most successful musical groups of all time.

Filan has released three solo albums: You and Me (2013), Right Here (2015) and Love Always (2017). He has appeared fourteen times in the UK Singles Chart with number-one hits, making him one of the most-appeared Irish music artists in British music number-one singles history.

Early life
Shane Steven Filan was born on 5 July 1979 in Sligo, Ireland. He is the son of Peter and Mae Filan (née McNicholas). Filan is the youngest of seven siblings; he has three brothers and three sisters. From a very early age, Filan worked behind the counter of his parents' business - a diner in Sligo - including on school Holidays.

He attended primary school at a local Catholic school, and secondary school at Summerhill College, with future Westlife bandmates Kian Egan and Mark Feehily. All three of them participated in a school production of Grease. The Hawkswell Theatre became a significant part of their careers.

Filan was a fan of Michael Jackson as a child, and claimed the singer inspired him to pursue a career in music. Before Westlife, he studied business and accounting.

Career

Six as One, IOYOU and Westlife (1997–2012)

Before Westlife, Egan and Feehily were with Filan in a band known as Six as One and, later on, IOYOU, with other Sligonians Derrick Lacey, Graham Keighron, and Michael "Miggles" Garrett. He co-wrote the IOYOU song "Together Girl Forever." For six months, Shane's mother, Mae Filan, tried to phone Boyzone manager Louis Walsh, eventually succeeding in talking to him about her son's band. Three of the members were dropped and the other three, Filan, Egan, and Feehily, joined in finding two more singers for the band. The members that joined were Nicky Byrne and Brian McFadden, forming Westside. The name of the band was subsequently changed to Westlife as there were already a number of bands with the name Westside. Filan, along with Feehily and McFadden, became the co-lead singers of the band. Their first album was released in November 1999, titled Westlife.

With Westlife, Filan has received twenty-eight platinum discs and sold 55 million records worldwide. In his 2014 book My Side of Life, he revealed that in 2001, he had been the first member of Westlife to be offered a solo record deal, but that he had rejected it, as he was scared of going solo.

Solo career, You and Me (2012–2014)
On 20 October 2011, Westlife announced that they had decided to split and go their separate ways at the end of their 2012 Farewell Tour. Filan showed interest in being a solo music artist for his daily living. In December 2011, press reports announced Filan was close to signing a solo deal with one of several potential competing UK record labels. Filan and his manager Louis Walsh, had been in talks with several of the labels at the time. "There's four, possibly five labels so far who have made it clear that they want to sign Shane," said a music source to showbiz writer Paul Martin.

In a March 2012 interview with Paul Martin, Filan said he would be signing within the next few weeks.
"It's exciting but, of course, I'll be nervous. It's only natural when you're coming out of a band after 14 years, you don't know where your life's going to take you [...]

In 2013, Filan announced he had officially signed a record deal with UMG subsidiary London Records worth 20 million British pounds. UMG had previously offered him a solo deal in 2001; the first member of Westlife to have received such an offer, but turned it down. For the new deal, Filan stated that he had spent the past 12 months in both US and UK writing songs and recording, and that a forthcoming single and an album would be released later in the year.

On 10 May 2013, he announced that his first single would be released, along with three other tracks, later revealed in July to be "Everything to Me", and "Everytime", "Today's Not Yesterday" and "Once", respectively. The release date was announced as 25 August.

On 10 September 2013, Filan released About You, the second single from his album You and Me, followed by the album shortly after.

Right Here (2015)
After the Westlife split, bankruptcy, the You and Me Tour,  and his debut autobiography My Side of Life, Filan announced on 13 March 2015 that he was working on his second studio album, Right Here. The album was mostly recorded in London and Denmark, and featured collaborations with Cutfather (The Saturdays, JLS), Jez Ashurst (Will Young, Gabrielle Aplin), Jon Maguire (Union J), Tre Jean-Marie (MNEK, Jason Derulo), and Girls Aloud.
The album was released on 25 September 2015, reaching #1 on the Irish Album Charts during its first week.

Love Always (2017–2018)
On 25 August 2017, Filan released his third studio album Love Always. and announced his next tour, the Love Always Tour 2017.

Previously, in April 2010, an unreleased solo song by Filan called Beautiful in White leaked on the Internet, but was incorrectly credited as being recorded by Shayne Ward instead of Filan. During this time, Filan also did a duet with Irish country singer Nathan Carter. The album reached #5 in the UK Album Charts, making it his highest-charting album in the United Kingdom, and therefore making him the most successful Westlife member as a solo artist in the charts to date.

In 2018, Filan also had success in Asia, including the Philippines, Indonesia, Malaysia, Singapore, and South Korea. Beautiful in White was particularly successful in Asia.

Westlife reunion with new single, album, and tour (2018–present) 
On 3 October 2018 Westlife announced their reunion as a four-member band. In 2019 four singles were released, penned by Ed Sheeran. The group embarked on a hugely successful 50 date tour called "The 20 Tour", in honour of Westlife's 20th anniversary since the release of their first single in 1999. On 15 November their 13th studio album, Spectrum, was released.

Personal life
Filan married his childhood sweetheart, Gillian Walsh on 28 December 2003 at Ballintubber Abbey, followed by a reception at Ashford Castle, Ireland. Gillian is the cousin of fellow band member Kian Egan, making Filan and Egan cousins-in-law. They have three children: daughter Nicole Rose (born on 23 July 2005 in Sligo, Ireland) and sons Patrick Michael, (born on 15 September 2008 in Sligo, Ireland) and Shane Peter (born 22 January 2010), named after his father.

He and his eldest brother, Finbarr, ran Shafin Developments – a property development company. The company was placed in receivership in May 2012 and Filan was declared bankrupt a little over a month later after suffering losses in Ireland's property crash.

Philanthropy

Discography

Filan has released three studio albums, eight singles, and two featured songs.

Studio albums

Singles

As lead artist

As featured artist

Promotional singles

Music videos

As lead artist

Songwriting
Sources: APRA, ASCAP, BMI, OSA, SESAC, SOCAN, SUISA Repertoires. In SESAC, Filan uses John Francis Filan as an alias.
Filan has co-written a number of songs including:

Westlife (1998–2012; 2018–present)
"Starlight"
"Alone Together"
"Wild Dreams"
"Lifeline"
"Rewind"
"Magic"
"Always With Me"
"Take Me There"
"L.O.V.E"
"Fragile Heart"
"Bop Bop Baby" (reached No. 5 in the UK Singles Chart)
"Don't Say It's Too Late"
"I Wanna Grow Old with You"
"I'm Missing Loving You"
"Singing Forever"
"Where We Belong"
"Never Knew I Was Losing You"
"Love Crime"
"How Does It Feel"
"Crying Girl"
"Reason for Living"
"Miss You When I'm Dreaming"
"A Little Part of Me / Little Part of Me / Extraordinary Love"
"Love Ain't War"
"This Life"
"Closer"
"Too Hard to Say Goodbye"
"Last Mile of the Way"

Love Always (2017–2018)
"Completely"
"Eyes Don't Lie"
"Crazy Over You"
"Back To You"
"Girl in My Heart"

Right Here (2015)
"I Could Be"
"Right Here"
"Better off a Fool"
"I Can't Get Over You"
"Effortlessly You"
"All My Love"

You and Me (2013)
"Everything to Me"
"About You"
"All You Need to Know"
"Knee Deep in My Heart"
"One of These Days"
"Everytime"
"Always Tomorrow"
"When I Met You"
"Everything's Gonna Be Alright"
"Coming Home"
"Baby Let's Dance"
"In the End"
"You and Me"
"Just the Way You Love Me"
"Once"	
"Today's Not Yesterday"

 – Songs were found to be Filan's co-written songs during his time with Westlife. No other details whether it's for Westlife or not.

Unreleased
All About You
As Far As I Go
Back Home
Best is Yet to Come
Don't Look Back
Counting the Days
Fall in Love With Me
Feel Alive
Headed for a Fall
I Can't Get By
I Got Nothing at All
I Love You
Intimate
Lean Back
Learn to Fly
Letting it Go
Like 'Em Wild
Love and Plan B
Lullaby
More
Never Give Up Lullaby
Night Sky
No One's in Control
Not in This Alone
One Last Second Chance
Only Got Tonight
Only You
Our Story
Save Me
Say We'll Meet Again
Shine Down
Slowing Down
Skyline
The Perfect Storm
The Truth
Things are Looking Up
Too Strong
Wherever You Are
Wouldn't Change a Thing About You
You Always Will
Your Ordinary Man

Songs written for other artists
"Listen Girl" performed by Johan Östberg
"Let Me Be the One" performed by Simon Casey
"Sei Parte Ormai Di Me" performed by Il Divo, in their self-titled album (2004)
"The Music Won't Last / Music Won't Last" performed by Jerry Given

Tours

Concert tours

Headlining

As part of a group

As a solo performer

You and Me Tour (2014) 
Support Acts

 Klarisse de Guzman
 Ben Montague

Cancelled Shows

Right Here Tour (2016) 
Support Acts

 Joe Miles
 Nikki Loy

Love Always Tour (2017–2019) 
Support Acts:

Guy Sebastian
Matt Gresham
Max Restaino
Andy Brown
Sitti
Sabrina
V.O.S.
Angeline Quinto (replacement for Morissette Amon in the Davao leg)
Morissette Amon (cancelled due to voice rest)
Jed Madela

Supporting

Lionel Richie (2018)

Promotional tours
2013–2017 UK and Ireland Tour
2013, 2014, 2018 Indonesia, Malaysia, Philippine, Singapore Tour

Shane Filan Band
In 2017-2018 UK and Ireland Love Always Tour, The Chip Shop Boys accompanied Filan as his bandmates.

Honours and awards

See also
Westlife songlist
Westlife tours
Westlife awards
UK Singles Chart records and statistics
List of artists who reached number one on the UK Singles Chart
List of best-selling music artists in the United Kingdom in singles sales
List of artists by number of UK Singles Chart number ones
List of UK Singles Chart number ones of the 2000s
List of UK Singles Downloads Chart number ones of the 2000s
List of UK Albums Chart number ones of the 2000s
List of artists who reached number one in Ireland

References

External links
 
 

 
1979 births
Living people
20th-century Irish musicians
21st-century Irish musicians
20th-century Irish male  singers
21st-century Irish male  singers
Ballad musicians
Brit Award winners
Capitol Records artists
Irish pop musicians
London Records artists
MCA Records artists
MCA Music Inc. (Philippines) artists
Pop rock musicians
Power pop musicians
Folk-pop singers
Pop rock singers
RCA Records artists
Irish male singer-songwriters
Sony BMG artists
Syco Music artists
Universal Music Group artists
People educated at Summerhill College
Warner Music Group artists
World Music Awards winners
Irish tenors
Irish baritones
Irish pop singers
People from Sligo (town)
Westlife members
British television presenters
Irish television personalities
Irish male dancers
Irish male film actors
Irish male stage actors
Irish male musical theatre actors
Parlophone artists
East West Records artists